A territorial abbey (or territorial abbacy) is a particular church of the Catholic Church comprising defined territory which is not part of a diocese but surrounds an abbey or monastery whose  abbot or superior functions as ordinary for all Catholics and parishes in the territory. Such an abbot is called a territorial abbot or abbot nullius diœceseos (abbreviated abbot nullius and Latin for "abbot of no diocese"). A territorial abbot thus differs from an ordinary abbot, who exercises authority only within the monastery's walls or to monks or canons who have taken their vows there. A territorial abbot is equivalent to a diocesan bishop in Catholic canon law.

While most belong to the Latin Church, and usually to the Benedictine  or Cistercian Orders, there are Eastern Catholic territorial abbeys — most notably the Italo-Greek Abbey of Grottaferrata.

History
Though territorial (like other) abbots are elected by the monks of their abbey, a territorial abbot can only receive the abbatial blessing and be installed under mandate from the pope, just as a bishop cannot be ordained and installed as ordinary of a diocese without such a mandate.

After the Second Vatican Council, more emphasis has been placed on the unique nature of the episcopacy and on the traditional organization of the church into dioceses under bishops. As such, abbeys nullius have been phased out in favor of the erection of new dioceses or the absorption of the territory into an existing diocese. A few ancient abbeys nullius still exist in Europe, and one in Korea.

Present territorial abbeys
There are eleven remaining territorial abbeys, as listed by the Vatican in the Annuario Pontificio:
 Austria
 Wettingen-Mehrerau

 Hungary 
 Pannonhalma

 Italy
 Monte Oliveto Maggiore
 Montevergine
 Santa Maria di Grottaferrata
 Santissima Trinità di Cava de’ Tirreni
 Subiaco
 Monte Cassino (lost most territory to the Diocese of Sora-Aquino-Pontecorvo)

 Korea
 Tŏkwon (덕원), North Korea
 Tŏkwon (currently the only territorial abbey outside Europe) has been vacant for many years. The Abbot of Waegwan is its present apostolic administrator. It has not been united with any Korean diocese on account of the effective vacancy of the dioceses of North Korea and the lack of effective jurisdiction applied by the Church in South Korea.

 Switzerland
 Saint-Maurice d’Agaune
 Maria Einsiedeln

Other historical territorial abbeys 
Historically there have been more, such as:

Americas 
 in North America :
 Belmont Abbey – Mary, Help of Christians, which was the juriasdiction governing half of North Carolina from 1910 until 1960, when it lost its last piece of territory. The jurisdiction  as a territorial abbey was formally suppressed in 1977, and the house is now a normal monastery located within the Diocese of Charlotte.
 St. Peter-Muenster, which from 1921 until 1998 served a remote area of Saskatchewan, Canada. The abbey still exists as a normal monastery, but its territorial jurisdiction was absorbed by the Diocese of Saskatoon.

Asia 

 in Southeast Asia:
 Abbacy Nullius of Cebu (1565-1578) - an abbacy vere nullius dioecesis [Eng. "of no diocese"], which is a kind of abbacy where the religious superior has jurisdiction over the clergy and laity of a district or territory which forms no part whatever of any diocese, was established in 1565 by the Augustinian missionaries to the Philippines who came with the Legazpi expedition to evangelize the natives of the islands. The Augustinians were led by their superior, Andrés de Urdaneta, who consequently became the first prelate of Cebu. The territory of the abbacy covered the entirety of the Spanish East Indies which included the Philippine Islands and other Pacific Islands. The abbacy ceased to exist with the establishment of the Diocese of Manila in 1578 which took over the same territory.

References

External links 
 GCatholic.org - List of Current Territorial Abbacies

Attribution
 passim

Catholic ecclesiastical titles
Organisation of Catholic religious orders
 
 
Catholic Church legal terminology